On 10 September 2001, a suicide attack was carried out by Revolutionary People's Liberation Party/Front member Uğur Bülbül in Beyoğlu, Istanbul, at a police checkpoint in the Gümüşsuyu neighborhood. As a result of the explosion, two police officers and one passerby civilian along with the attacker were killed and 23 others were injured.

Attack 
At around 05:30 pm (UTC+02:00), Revolutionary People's Liberation Party/Front member Uğur Bülbül detonated explosive material at a police checkpoint between Vakıf Leasing-National Education Publications and the Chinese Restaurant buildings İnönü Street, which connects Gümüşsuyu to Taksim Square. While two police officers were killed in the blast, an Australian tourist passing by was seriously injured and died on 13 September. Due to the attack, 17 police officers and 6 other people were wounded.

See also
 Terrorism in Turkey

References 

2001 murders in Europe
Suicide bombings in 2001
Suicide bombings in Istanbul
2001 murders in Turkey
2000s in Istanbul
September 2001 events in Turkey
September 2001 crimes
DHKP/C attacks
Beyoğlu